Dlouhá Loučka may refer to places in the Czech Republic:

Dlouhá Loučka (Olomouc District), a municipality and village in the Olomouc Region
Dlouhá Loučka (Svitavy District), a municipality and village in the Pardubice Region